The USC School of Dramatic Arts (commonly referred to as SDA)—formerly the USC School of Theatre, is a private drama school at the University of Southern California in Los Angeles, California. It is ranked one of the top 10 dramatic arts schools in the world, according to The Hollywood Reporter's Top 25 Drama Schools. The school offers Bachelor of Arts degrees in theatre and visual & performing arts; Bachelor of Fine Arts degrees in acting, design, sound design, stage management and technical direction; and Master of Fine Arts degrees in acting and dramatic writing.

History
Founded in 1945 as Department of Drama at USC, it became an independent school in 1991 and was named USC School of Theatre. It was renamed USC School of Dramatic Arts on July 1, 2012.

In 2020, Dean David Bridel resigned after admitting to an affair with an undergraduate. Emily Roxworthy serves as the current dean of the school.

Notable faculty
Andy Robinson - actor (Dirty Harry, Star Trek: Deep Space Nine) and founder of the MFA in Acting Program at the USC School of Dramatic Arts.
Michael Keenan - actor (Picket Fences) and professor of acting and directing; directed USC plays and stage productions from 1987 to 2015
Anna Deavere Smith - playwright, actress, author, journalist; taught acting in the MFA program from 1985 to 1989.

Notable SDA alumni

Patrick J. Adams
Robin Bain
Leigh-Allyn Baker
Todd Black
Nathan Parsons
Troian Bellisario
Beck Bennett
LeVar Burton
Sophia Bush
Sorel Carradine
Tate Donovan
Anthony Edwards
Ryan Eggold
Will Harris
Evan Helmuth (1999)
Devin Kelley
Eric Ladin
James Lesure
Peter Levine
Alexander Ludwig
Kevin Mambo
Perry Mattfeld
Timothy Omundson
J. August Richards
John Ritter
Jon Rudnitsky
Stark Sands
Kyra Sedgwick
James Snyder (actor)
Anthony Sparks
Richard Speight Jr.
Karan Soni
Eric Stoltz
Danny Strong
Andy Tennant
TJ Thyne
Michael Uppendahl
Peter Vack
Forest Whitaker
Deborah Ann Woll
Colin Woodell

Programs of study
Undergraduate Degrees
Bachelor of Arts (BA)
BA in Theatre
BA in Theatre, Acting Emphasis
BA in Theatre, Comedy Emphasis
BA in Theatre, Design Emphasis
BA in Performing & Visual Arts
Bachelor of Fine Arts (BFA)
BFA in Acting
BFA in Design
BFA in Sound Design
BFA in Stage Management
BFA in Technical Direction
BFA in Musical Theatre
Graduate Degrees
Master of Fine Arts (MFA)
MFA in Acting
MFA in Dramatic Writing

Performance Venues
Bing Theatre
Drama Center and Massman Theatre
Scene Dock Theatre
McClintock Theatre

Theatrical Productions

The School of Dramatic Arts presents more than 20 theatrical shows annually that showcase the works of the students in acting, stage management, lighting design, set design, costume design, technical direction and more.

References

External links
 http://dramaticarts.usc.edu/

School of Theatre
Drama schools in the United States
Performing arts education in the United States
Performing arts in California